Urmetan (Russian and Tajik: Урметан) is a village and jamoat in north-western Tajikistan. It is located in Ayni District in Sughd Region. The jamoat has a total population of 18,016 (2015). It consists of 7 villages: Urmetan (the seat), Madm, Revad, Vashan, Veshkand, Vota and Yovon.

The village Urmetan is located along the RB12 highway between Ayni and Panjakent.

References

External links
Satellite map at Maplandia.com

Jamoats of Tajikistan
Populated places in Sughd Region